The Scottish Football Writers' Association Manager of the Year (often called the SFWA Manager of the Year, or simply the Scottish Manager of the Year) award is given to the manager in Scottish football who is seen to have been the best manager of the previous season. The award is voted for by the members of the Scottish Football Writers' Association.

The award was first given in 1987, and was won by Dundee United boss Jim McLean. The award has been won by a manager in the top division of the Scottish football league system in all but two years, 1990, when the award went to Scotland manager Andy Roxburgh and 1995 when the award was given to Jimmy Nicholl who managed Raith Rovers in the First Division. There is a similar award made by PFA Scotland, the PFA Scotland Manager of the Year, which was first given in 2007.


List of winners
As of 2022, the award has been presented 36 times and won by 24 different managers. Walter Smith (7), Neil Lennon (3), Martin O'Neill (3), Dick Advocaat (2) and Steve Clarke (2) are the managers who have won the award more than once.

Winners by club

See also
SFWA Footballer of the Year
SFWA International Player of the Year
SFWA Young Player of the Year

References

Scottish football trophies and awards
Scotland
Awards established in 1986
1986 establishments in Scotland